"Changed" is a song recorded by American country music group Rascal Flatts. It was released in December 2012 as the third single from their eighth studio album of the same name. The song was written by Gary LeVox, Wendell Mobley and Neil Thrasher. It was released to country radio on December 17, 2012, and AC and Christian AC radio on January 22, 2013.

History
The song came about from a true story told by the co-writer Neil Thrasher after his daughter was baptized on the beach. Thrasher shared the story of his daughter's baptism with Rascal Flatts lead vocalist Gary LeVox, and presented him with some lyrics that he had written about it. He sang the lines to LeVox, who finished the song with him and Wendell Mobley at LeVox's farm.

Critical reception

Billy Dukes of Taste of Country gave the song four and a half stars out of five, writing that "sonically, the soaring ballad has all of the hallmarks of a choice Rascal Flatts song." Matt Bjorke of Roughstock gave the song a favorable review, calling it "a lyrically strong song about giving up the past transgressions for a better path." Tara Seetharam of Country Universe gave the song a B, calling it "an earnest and relatively restrained performance and has legs."

Music videos
A live music video, directed by Shaun Silva, premiered in November 2012. It was cut from their DVD, All Access & Uncovered: The Making of Changed and Beyond. The official music video, directed by Carl Diebold, premiered in April 2013. The official video stars Chip Esten.

Chart performance
"Changed" debuted at number 52 on the U.S. Billboard Country Airplay chart for the week of January 5, 2013. It also debuted at number 48 on the U.S. Billboard Hot Country Songs chart for the week of January 26, 2013. As of the chart dated February 2, 2013, the song debuted at number 26 on the U.S. Billboard Christian Songs chart. This makes Rascal Flatts' first appearance on that chart. It also debuted at number 73 on the U.S. Billboard Hot 100 chart and number 54 on the Canadian Hot 100 chart for the week of March 31, 2012. As of the chart dated March 2, 2013, the song debuted at number 29 on the U.S. Billboard Hot Christian Adult Contemporary chart. This is Rascal Flatts' first appearance on that chart. It peaked at number 20 on Country Airplay and number 25 on Hot Country Songs.

Year-end charts

Certifications

Release history

References

2012 singles
Rascal Flatts songs
Songs written by Wendell Mobley
Songs written by Neil Thrasher
Song recordings produced by Dann Huff
Music videos directed by Shaun Silva
Songs written by Gary LeVox
Big Machine Records singles
2012 songs